Karl Heun (born 3 April 1859, Wiesbaden; died 10 January 1929, Karlsruhe) was a German mathematician who introduced Heun's equation, Heun functions, and Heun's method.

Karl Heun studied mathematics and philosophy in Göttingen (and briefly in Halle). In 1881 with the dissertation Die Kugelfunktionen und Laméschen Funktionen als Determinanten he received his doctorate under Schering at the University of Göttingen. He then worked as a teacher at an agricultural college in Wehlau, until in 1883 he emigrated to England where he taught until 1885 in Uppingham.

He completed his studies in London and received his Habilitierung qualification in June 1886 in Munich with the thesis Über lineare Differentialgleichungen zweiter Ordnung, deren Lösungen durch den Kettenbruchalgorithmus verknüpft sind. From 1886 to 1889 he taught at the University of Munich, but because of financial circumstances from 1890 to 1902 he had to work as a teacher in Berlin.

In 1900 Karl Heun received the title of Professor and then in 1902 he obtained the professorial chair of theoretical mechanics at the Technische Hochschule Karlsruhe, where he worked until he retired with a pension in 1922.

References

External links
 
 

19th-century German mathematicians
20th-century German mathematicians
1859 births
1929 deaths